Badaling railway station  is a station of Jingbao Railway in Beijing. The station opened in 1979.

It should not be confused with the high-speed rail station Badaling Great Wall railway station which opened in December 2019.

See also
List of stations on Jingbao railway

References

Railway stations in Beijing